Love Songs is a compilation album by Australian singer John Farnham. It was released in Germany in July 2002.

Track listing 
CD
 "Love to Shine" (Harry Bogdanovs) - 4:02
 "You're the Voice" (Andy Qunta, Keith Reid, Maggie Ryder, Chris Thompson) - 5:05
 "A Touch of Paradise" (Ross Wilson, Gulliver Smith) - 4:47
 "Please Don't Ask Me" (Graham Goble) - 3:19
 "She Says to Me" (Graham Globe) - 3:49
 "Jillie's Song" (John Farnham, Graham Goble) - 3:59
 "On My Own" (Graham Goble) - 5:12
 "Help!" (John Lennon, Paul McCartney) - 4:24
 "Listen to the Wind" (Jonathan Stevens / Brent Thomas) - 4:22
 "We're No Angels" (Ross Wilson) - 4:50
 "In Days to Come" (John Farnham, Ross Fraser, David Hirschfelder) - 4:05
 "Burn for You" (Phil Buckle, Ross Fraser) - 3:33
 "I Can Do Anything" (Phil Buckle, John Farnham) - 4:26
 "Treated This Way" (Phil Buckle, John Farnham, Ross Fraser, Richard Marx) - 4:08
 "The Reason Why" (Phil Buckle, Richard Marx) - 3:40
 "Romeo's Heart" (J.D. Kimball) - 4:18

References 

John Farnham compilation albums
2002 compilation albums